Matt Sazama and Burk Sharpless are American screenwriters, best known for writing films together, like Dracula Untold, The Last Witch Hunter, Gods of Egypt and Morbius.

Career 
In August 2008, Sazama and Sharpless were hired by Sony Pictures Entertainment to write the script for the film adaptation of Flash Gordon, with Breck Eisner attached as director.

In January 2011, 20th Century Fox hired Sazama and Sharpless to adapt Atari's 1980s arcade game Missile Command. In August 2011, Universal hired Sazama and Sharpless to write the script for a feature film based on the Hasbro board game Clue. In September 2011, Chernin Entertainment bought an untitled pitch by Sazama and Sharpless, which was described as a futuristic Jungle Book.

Sazama and Sharpless wrote the script for the 2014 horror fantasy film Dracula Untold, starring Luke Evans, Sarah Gadon, and Dominic Cooper. The film was directed by Gary Shore and released in the United States by Universal Pictures on October 10, 2014.

Sazama and Sharpless also re-wrote Cory Goodman's original draft of the 2015 fantasy thriller film The Last Witch Hunter, starring Vin Diesel, Elijah Wood, Rose Leslie, Julie Engelbrecht, and Michael Caine. Breck Eisner directed the film, which was released on October 23, 2015 by Summit Entertainment.

In addition, Sazama and Sharpless wrote the screenplay for the fantasy action film Gods of Egypt, starring Nikolaj Coster-Waldau, Brenton Thwaites, Gerard Butler, and Geoffrey Rush. The film, directed by Alex Proyas, was released on February 26, 2016 by Lionsgate.

In November 2015, Netflix announced a remake of the 1965 TV series Lost in Space, hiring Sazama and Sharpless to write. Sazama and Sharpless contributed to the story of the 2017 Power Rangers reboot. In 2017, it was announced that Sony Pictures hired the duo to pen the script for the film adaptation of Marvel Comics character, Morbius, the Living Vampire. The movie is part of their shared universe titled Sony Pictures Universe of Marvel Characters. They are also set to write a film adaptation of Madame Web for 2023.

Future projects 
In June 2015, Walt Disney Pictures hired Sazama and Sharpless to write a live-action adaptation of the Night on Bald Mountain sequence from the 1940s animated film Fantasia, which they would also executive produce.

Filmography 
Film

Television
 Lost in Space (2018–2021) (showrunners and executive producers)

References

External links 
 
 

American male writers
American male screenwriters
American screenwriters
American television producers
American television writers
Screenwriting duos